La Unión  is a city in Greater Buenos Aires, Argentina, in the Ezeiza Partido.

Parishes of the Catholic Church in La Unión

References 

Cities in Argentina
Populated places in Buenos Aires Province
Ezeiza Partido